Ripper is the slang term for a type of hot dog. The name derives from a hot dog which is deep fried in oil, which sometimes causes the casing to burst, or "rip".

"Rippers" were featured in the Travel Channel special "Deep Fried Paradise" and served as a major plot point in a first-season episode of the internet serial "Ripster's" which centers on the Pennsylvania tavern of the same name that serves a similar type of hot dog.

See also
 List of hot dogs
 Rutt's Hut

References

Cuisine of New Jersey
Deep fried foods
Hot dogs
Restaurant terminology